Dungal may also refer to:

People
 Saint Dungal
 Dungal of Bobbio
 Dungal MacDouall
 Dúngal Eilni mac Scandail
 Dúngal mac Amalgado
 Dúngal mac Cellaig
 Dúngal mac Selbaig or Dungal of Dalriada
 Dubgall mac Somairle, also known as Dungal, Dúngal, and Dùnghal
 Indrechtach mac Dungalaig

Places
Dungal, Guinea-Bissau, near Badancar
Reyhan Shahr, formerly Dungal, a city in Iran

See also
Dangal (disambiguation)